The Get Together is a 2020 American comedy film directed by Will Bakke and starring Alejandro Rose-Garcia, Johanna Braddy, Jacob Artist and Courtney Parchman.

Cast
Alejandro Rose-Garcia as Caleb
Johanna Braddy as Betsy
Jacob Artist as Damien
Courtney Parchman as August
Stephanie Hunt as Nora
Bill Wise as Rick
Luxy Banner as McCall

Release
The film premiered in October 2020 at the Austin Film Festival.

Reception
The film has a 90% rating on Rotten Tomatoes based on ten reviews.

Selome Hailu of The Austin Chronicle awarded the film three and a half stars out of five and wrote, "The college archetypes get a bit on-the-nose, and some lingering underwater scenes feel jammed in to match other coming-of-agers. But ultimately, the imperfections just feel cute."

Tara McNamara of Common Sense Media awarded the film two stars out of five.

Cat Cardenas of Texas Monthly gave the film a negative review and wrote, "Though the premise of each film is a party, The Get Together fails to deliver on heart."

References

External links
 
 

2020 films
2020 comedy films
American comedy films
2020s English-language films
2020s American films